Upper Camster is a small hamlet, which lies at the source of the Camster Burn, 4 miles north of Lybster,  in Caithness, Scottish Highlands and is in the Scottish council area of Highland.

The Grey Cairns of Camster are two large Neolithic chambered cairns located about quarter of a mile north of Upper Camster. The cairns, which are considered to be examples of the Orkney-Cromarty type of chambered cairn, were constructed in the third or fourth millennium BC in a desolate stretch of boggy peat-covered moorland in the Flow Country of Caithness.

Gallery

References

Populated places in Caithness